This is a summary of the year 2007 in the Canadian music industry.

Events
 February 3 
 At a Calgary Flames game, young Cree singer Akina Shirt becomes the first person to perform "O Canada" in an Aboriginal language at a major league sporting event.
 American rock band The White Stripes tour Canada in the summer, booking a number of shows in small markets such as Glace Bay, Whitehorse and Iqaluit with the stated goal of performing in every Canadian province and territory. The band also films the video for their single "You Don't Know What Love Is (You Just Do as You're Told)" in Iqaluit.
 March 30 – Influential Canadian rock band Rheostatics perform a farewell show at Toronto's Massey Hall
 April 1 – Juno Awards of 2007 held
 June 2 – the Canadian Hot 100 was released replacing the Canadian Singles Chart
 June 17 – 2007 MuchMusic Video Awards held
 July 10 – 2007 Polaris Music Prize shortlist announced
 August 3 – Jacksoul singer Haydain Neale is seriously injured in a traffic accident
 September 24 – Patrick Watson's Close to Paradise wins the 2007 Polaris Music Prize

Albums

A
The Acorn, Glory Hope Mountain
Apostle of Hustle, National Anthem of Nowhere
Arcade Fire, Neon Bible
Jann Arden, Uncover Me

B
Sebastian Bach, Angel Down
Barenaked Ladies, Barenaked Ladies Are Men
Bedouin Soundclash, Street Gospels
Daniel Bélanger, L'Échec du matériel
Ridley Bent, Buckles and Boots
The Besnard Lakes, The Besnard Lakes Are the Dark Horse
Bionic, Black Blood
The Birthday Massacre, Walking with Strangers
Blood Meridian, Liquidate Paris!
Blue Rodeo, Small Miracles
Isabelle Boulay, De retour à la source
Jim Bryson, Where the Bungalows Roam
Michael Bublé, Call Me Irresponsible
Buck 65, Situation
Basia Bulat, Oh, My Darling

C
Paul Cargnello, Brûler le jour
Caribou, Andorra
Chromeo, Fancy Footwork
The Choir Practice, The Choir Practice
The Cliks, Snakehouse
Code Pie, The Most Trusted Name In Yous
Jesse Cook, Frontiers
Cowboy Junkies, At the End of Paths Taken, Trinity Revisited
Deborah Cox, Destination Moon
 Eliana Cuevas, Vidas
Cuff the Duke, Sidelines of the City

D
The Diableros, The Diableros Aren't Ready for the Country
Céline Dion, D'Elles
Céline Dion, Taking Chances
Do Make Say Think, You, You're a History in Rust
Julie Doiron, Woke Myself Up
Dragonette, Galore
Kevin Drew, Spirit If...

E
Coral Egan, Magnify
André Ethier, On Blue Fog

F
Feist, The Reminder
Christine Fellows, Nevertheless
Finger Eleven, Them vs. You vs. Me

G
Grand Analog, Calligraffiti
Great Lake Swimmers, Ongiara

H
Emily Haines & the Soft Skeleton, What Is Free to a Good Home?
Handsome Furs, Plague Park
Hedley, Famous Last Words
Holy Fuck, LP
Hot Hot Heat, Happiness Ltd.
Hot Little Rocket, How to Lose Everything
Hunter Valentine, The Impatient Romantic

I
Immaculate Machine, Immaculate Machine's Fables

J
Lyndon John X, Two Chord Skankin'
The Junction, The Junction
Junior Boys, The Dead Horse EP

K
Kaïn, Les saisons s'tassent

L
Avril Lavigne, The Best Damn Thing
Lightning Dust, Lightning Dust
Lola Dutronic, Lola Dutronic Album 2 - The Love Parade
Corb Lund, Horse Soldier! Horse Soldier!

M
Raine Maida, The Hunters Lullaby
John Mann, December Looms
Marie-Mai, Dangereuse Attraction
Marilou, Marilou
Metric, Grow Up and Blow Away
Joni Mitchell, Shine
Kim Mitchell, Ain't Life Amazing
Miracle Fortress, Five Roses
Katie Moore, Only Thing Worse
The Most Serene Republic, Population

N
Neverending White Lights, Act 2: The Blood and the Life Eternal
The New Pornographers, Challengers
A Northern Chorus, The Millions Too Many

O
The OBGMs, Intercourse
Oh Susanna, Short Stories

P
The Paperbacks, An Illusion Against Death
Sandro Perri, Tiny Mirrors
The Phonemes, There's Something We've Been Meaning to Do
The Joel Plaskett Emergency, Ashtray Rock

R
Raising the Fawn, Sleight of Hand
Amanda Rheaume, If You Never Live
Rick White Album, Memoreaper
Andrew Rodriguez, Here Comes the Light
Rush, Snakes & Arrows

S
The Sadies, New Seasons
Shad, The Old Prince
Shapes and Sizes, Split Lips, Winning Hips, A Shiner
Nathalie Simard, Il y avait un jardin
Small Sins, Mood Swings
Spiral Beach, Ball
Stars, In Our Bedroom After the War
Sum 41, Underclass Hero
Sunset Rubdown, Random Spirit Lover
Skye Sweetnam, Sound Soldier

T
Tegan and Sara, The Con
They Shoot Horses, Don't They?, Pick Up Sticks
Marie-Élaine Thibert, Comme ça
Thousand Foot Krutch, The Flame in All of Us
Devin Townsend, Ziltoid the Omniscient
Two Hours Traffic, Little Jabs

V
Various Artists, 93 tours
Various Artists, Friends in Bellwoods
Various Artists, The Secret Sessions (Rheostatics tribute album)
Various Artists, Songs From Instant Star Three

W
Rufus Wainwright, Release the Stars
Wax Mannequin, Orchard and Ire
The Weakerthans, Reunion Tour
Wintersleep, Welcome to the Night Sky
Royal Wood, A Good Enough Day
Wooden Stars, People Are Different
Donovan Woods, The Hold Up

Y
You Say Party! We Say Die!, Lose All Time
Neil Young, Chrome Dreams II
Neil Young, Live at Massey Hall 1971

Top hits on record

Top 10 albums

Top 10 American albums

Top 2 International Albums

Deaths
 January 19: Denny Doherty, a singer with the 1960s pop group, The Mamas and Papas
 February 17: Dermot O'Reilly, singer and member of the group Ryan's Fancy
 June 15: Richard Bell, musician
 September 25: Patrick Bourque, former bassist from country group Emerson Drive

References